Robert Alasdair Pearce (born 28 November 1951) is a British academic. He was the Vice-Chancellor of the University of Wales, Lampeter between 2003 and 2008.

Educated at Grammar Schools in Birmingham, Bristol and Gloucester, Pearce went on to study law at Pembroke College, Oxford (BA Hons (Jurisprudence) 1973; BCL 1974; MA 1978). From there he went on to hold academic positions at the Universities of Newcastle upon Tyne, Lancaster, University College Cork (part of the National University of Ireland), and at the University of Western Ontario.

Pearce was Professor in Law at the University of Buckingham between 1990 and 2003, where he was successively Pro-Vice-Chancellor, Deputy Vice-Chancellor and Acting Vice-Chancellor. On 1 October 2003, he became the Vice-Chancellor of the University of Wales, Lampeter, in succession to Keith Robbins.  In this capacity, he was Welsh Supernumerary Fellow of Jesus College, Oxford for the academic year 2007/8.  He retired as Vice-Chancellor in September 2008. Alfred Morris was announced as his interim successor.

He has also been an academic auditor for the Quality Assurance Agency for Higher Education and its predecessor, the Higher Education Quality Council, since 1993.

References

English legal professionals
People educated at Bristol Grammar School
Alumni of Pembroke College, Oxford
Academics of the University of Buckingham
Academics of Newcastle University
People associated with the University of Wales, Lampeter
People educated at Sir Thomas Rich's School
Living people
1951 births
English Anglicans
Fellows of Jesus College, Oxford